These were the nine squads (all Test nations) picked to take part in the 1998 ICC KnockOut Trophy, the first installment of the Champions Trophy cricket tournament. The tournament was held in Bangladesh from 24 October to 2 November 1998. Teams could name a preliminary squad of 30, but only 14-man squads were permitted for the actual tournament, one month before the start of the tournament. In the knockout tournament, New Zealand and Zimbabwe were the only teams to play a pre-quarter final match. New Zealand won the match and qualified for the quarter-final where they faced Sri Lanka. South Africa won the inaugural edition of the ICC KnockOut Trophy by defeating West Indies in the final by four wickets.

Mike Rindel, Herschelle Gibbs and Andrew Hudson were not selected initially in the South African squad. But later, Rindel was recalled in place of injured Gary Kirsten, and Daryll Cullinan was selected as Rindel's opening partner. Arshad Khan, Shoaib Akhtar and Wasim Akram replaced Mushtaq Ahmed, Mohammad Zahid and Abdul Razzaq in the Pakistani squad. Waqar Younis who had not recovered from his elbow injury was left out, whereas Aaqib Javed was recalled into the 14-men squad. Saeed Anwar and Inzamam-ul-Haq were dropped from the initial Pakistani squad due to their withdrawal following injuries, and were replaced by Saleem Elahi and Akhtar Sarfraz. Many New Zealand key players—Dion Nash, Chris Cairns, Llorne Howell and Gavin Larsen—were unavailable for the tournament due to different kind of injuries. Fast bowler, Simon Doull was back into the squad replacing Chris Drum who was also injured.

Squads

Australia

England

India

New Zealand

Pakistan

South Africa

Sri Lanka

West Indies

Zimbabwe

References

External links

1998
Squads